Mirza Panak (also Romanized as Mīrzā Pānak, Mīrzā Pāng, and Mīrzā Pānag) is a village in Yanqaq Rural District in the Central District of Galikash County, Golestan Province, Iran. At the 2006 census, its population was 1,881, in 435 families.

References 

Populated places in Galikash County